The Women's Prison at Christianshavn in Copenhagen, Denmark, was a correctional facility which existed under various names from the mid 17th century until 1921. From 1870 it served as a women's prison. Earlier names included Børnehuset and Tugt- og Rasphuset. Its last building, which dated from 1861, was torn down in 1928 to make way for an expansion of Torvegade.

History

The institution  Børnehuset, a royal orphanage, was established at the site in 1622. It was gradually converted into a prison. The old building was replaced by a new one designed in the Baroque style by Philip de Lange and constructed between 1739 and 1742.

Lange's building was demolished in the early 1860s to make way for a new prison building completed in 1864 to designs by Niels Sigfred Nebelong. From 1870 it was known as Christianshavns Straffeanstalt (Christianshavn Penitentiary) and served as a prison for women.

Christianshavn Penitentiary was demolished in 1928 in connection with a widening of Torvegade.

References

External links

Prisons in Denmark
History of Copenhagen
1921 disestablishments in Denmark
1861 establishments in Denmark
Niels Sigfred Nebelong buildings
Buildings and structures demolished in 1928
Demolished buildings and structures in Denmark
History of women in Denmark